Western Armenian is one of the two standardized forms of Modern Armenian, the other being Eastern Armenian. It is based mainly on the Istanbul Armenian dialect, as opposed to Eastern Armenian, which is mainly based on the Yerevan Armenian dialect.

Until the early 20th century, various Western Armenian dialects were also spoken in the Ottoman Empire, especially in the eastern regions historically populated by Armenians known as Western Armenia. The spoken or dialectal varieties of Western Armenian currently in use include Homshetsi, spoken by the Hemshin peoples; the dialects of Armenians of Kessab, Latakia and Jisr al-Shughur of Syria, Anjar of Lebanon, and Istanbul and Vakıflı, of Turkey (part of the "Sueidia" dialect). Sasun and Mush dialect is also spoken in modern-day Armenia villages such as Bazmaberd and Sasnashen. The  Cilician dialect is also spoken in Cyprus, where it is taught in Armenian schools (Nareg), and is the first language of about 3,000 people of Armenian descent.

Forms of the Karin dialect of Western Armenian are spoken by several hundred thousand people in Northern Armenia, mostly in Gyumri, Artik, Akhuryan, and around 130 villages in the Shirak province, and by Armenians in Samtskhe–Javakheti province of Georgia (Akhalkalaki, Akhaltsikhe).

A mostly diasporic language and one that is not an official language of any state, Western Armenian faces extinction as its native speakers lose fluency in Western Armenian amid pressures to assimilate into their host countries. Estimates place the number of fluent speakers of Western Armenian outside Armenia and Georgia at less than one million.

Classification
Western Armenian is an Indo-European language and belongs to the Armenic branch of the family, along with Eastern and Classical Armenian. According to Glottolog Antioch, Artial, Asia Minor, Bolu, Hamshenic, Kilikien, Mush-Tigranakert, Stanoz, Vanic and Yozgat are the main dialects of Western Armenian.

Eastern Armenian and Western Armenian are, for the most part, mutually intelligible for educated or literate users of the other, while illiterate or semiliterate users of lower registers of each one may have difficulty understanding the other variant. One phonological difference is that voiced stops in Eastern Armenian are voiceless in Western Armenian.

Speakers
Western Armenian is spoken by Armenians of most of the Middle East except for Iran, and Rostov-on-Don in Russia. It is spoken by only a small percentage of Armenians in Turkey as a first language, with 18 percent among the community in general and 8 percent among younger people. Western Armenian used to be the dominant Armenian variety, but as a result of the Armenian genocide, Western Armenia was wiped clean of Western Armenians. Those who fled to Eastern Armenia now speak either Eastern Armenian or have a diglossic situation between Western Armenian dialects in informal usage and an Eastern Armenian standard. The only Western Armenian dialect still spoken in Western Armenia is the Homshetsi dialect, since the Hemshin peoples, who were Muslim converts, did not fall victim to the Armenian genocide.

On 21 February 2009, International Mother Language Day, a new edition of the Atlas of the World's Languages in Danger was released by UNESCO in which the Western Armenian language in Turkey was defined as a definitely endangered language. To oppose this, VANArmenya prepared a cartoon in Armenian based on Speed Racer.

Phonology

Vowels

Monophthongs
Western Armenian has eight monophthongs.

Diphthongs
Western Armenian has ten environments in which two vowels in the orthography appear next to each other, called diphthongs. By definition, they appear in the same syllable. For those unfamiliar with IPA symbols,  represents the English "y" sound. If used at the beginning of a word, "ե" alone is sufficient to represent  (as in yes). The Armenian letter "յ" is used for the glide after vowels. The following examples are sometimes across syllable and morpheme boundaries, and gliding is then expected:

Consonants
This is the Western Armenian Consonantal System using letters from the International Phonetic Alphabet (IPA), followed by the corresponding Armenian letter in brackets.

The  in Armenian is rare; the letter "ֆ" was added to the alphabet much later.  The  glide is not used except for foreign proper nouns, like Washington (by utilizing the "u" vowel, Armenian "ու").

Differences from Classical Armenian
Differences in phonology between Western Armenian and Classical Armenian  include the distinction of stops and affricates.

Firstly, while Classical Armenian has a three-way distinction of stops and affricates (one voiced and two voiceless: one plain and one aspirated), Western Armenian has kept only a two-way distinction (one voiced and one aspirated). For example, Classical Armenian has three bilabial stops (and  ), but Western Armenian has only two bilabial stops (  and  /).

Secondly, Western Armenian has both changed the Classical Armenian voiced stops and voiced affricates to aspirated stops and aspirated affricates and replaced the plain stops and affricates with voiced consonants.

Specifically, here are the shifts from Classical Armenian to Western Armenian:
 Bilabial stops:
 voicing of Classical   to 
 Alveolar stops:
 voicing of Classical   to 
 Velar stops:
 voicing of Classical   to 
 Alveolar affricates:
 voicing of Classical   to 
 Post-alveolar affricates:
 voicing of Classical   to 

As a result, a word like  'water' (spelled  in Classical Armenian) is cognate with Western Armenian  (also spelled ). However,  'grandson' and  'stone' are pronounced similarly in both Classical and Western Armenian.

Orthography

Western Armenian uses Classical Armenian orthography, also known as traditional Mashtotsian orthography. The Armenian orthography reform, commonly known as the Abeghian orthography, was introduced in the Armenian Soviet Socialist Republic and is still used by most Eastern Armenian speakers from modern Armenia. However, it has not been adopted by Eastern Armenian speakers of Iran and their diaspora or by speakers of Western Armenian, with the exception of periodical publications published in Romania and Bulgaria while under Communist regimes.

Morphology

Nouns
Western Armenian nouns have four grammatical cases: nominative-accusative (subject / direct object), genitive-dative (possession / indirect object), ablative (origin) and instrumental (means). Of the six cases, the nominative and accusative are the same, except for personal pronouns, and the genitive and dative are the same, meaning that nouns have four distinct forms for case. Nouns in Armenian also decline for number (singular and plural), but do not decline for gender (i.e. masculine or feminine).

Declension in Armenian is based on how the genitive is formed. There are several declensions, but one is dominant (the genitive in i) while a half-dozen other forms are in gradual decline and are being replaced by the i-form, which has virtually attained the status of a regular form:

Articles
Like English and some other languages, Armenian has definite and indefinite articles.

ator mə ('a chair', Nom.sg), atori mə ('of a chair', Gen.sg)

The definite article is a suffix attached to the noun, and is one of two forms, either -n (when the final sound is a vowel) or -ə (when the final sound is a consonant). When the word is followed by al (ալ = also, too), the conjunction u (ու), or the present or imperfect conjugated forms of the verb em (to be); however, it will always take -n:

 kirkə ('the book', Nom.sg)
 karin ('the barley' Nom.sg)
but:
 Sa kirkn e ('This is the book')
 Parin u charə ('The good and the bad')
 Inkn al ('S/he too')

The indefinite article becomes mən when it is followed by al (ալ = also, too) or the Present or imperfect conjugated forms of the verb em (to be):

 kirk mə ('a book', Nom.sg)
but:
 Sa kirk mən e ('This is a book')
 Kirk mən al ('A book as well')

Adjectives
Adjectives in Armenian do not decline for case or number, and precede the noun:

 agheg martə ('the good man', Nom.sg)
 agheg martun ('to the good man', Gen.sg)

Verbs

Verbs in Armenian are based on two basic series of forms, a "present" form and an "imperfect" form. From this, all other tenses and moods are formed with various particles and constructions. There is a third form, the preterite, which in Armenian is a tense in its own right, and takes no other particles or constructions.

The "present" tense in Western Armenian is based on three conjugations (a, e, i):

The present tense (as we know it in English) is made by adding the particle gə before the "present" form, except the defective verbs em (I am), gam (I exist, I'm there), unim (I have), kidem (I know) and gərnam (I can), while the future is made by adding bidi:

 Yes kirk′ə gə gartam (I am reading the book or I read the book, Pres)
 Yes kirk′ə bidi gartam (I will read the book, Fut).

For the exceptions:  (I shall be, have, know, be able).
In vernacular language, the particle "gor" is added after the verb to indicate present progressive tense. The distinction is not made in literary Armenian.

  (I am reading the book)

The verb without any particles constitutes the subjunctive mood, such as "if I eat, should I eat, that I eat, I wish I eat":

Personal pronouns

Demonstrative pronouns

Relative pronouns

See also
 Armenian verbs
 Hidden Armenians

Notes

References

Bibliography

External links
 Arak29 Eastern Armenian
 Arak29 Western Armenian
 Arak29 A Course in Modern Western Armenia
 Arak29 On-Line Dictionaries
 Arak29 Etymology
 Videos of people speaking Armenian

Western Armenian Online Dictionaries
 Nayiri.com (Library of Armenian dictionaries):
 Բառգիրք հայերէն լեզուի by Rev. Antranig Granian (about 18,000 terms; published in 1998 in Beirut). Great dictionary for students.
 ՀԱՅՈՑ ԼԵԶՈՒԻ ՆՈՐ ԲԱՌԱՐԱՆ published in two volumes in Beirut in 1992 (about 56,000 headwords). Arguably the best Western Armenian dictionary currently available.
 ՀԱՅԵՐԷՆ ԲԱՑԱՏՐԱԿԱՆ ԲԱՌԱՐԱՆ by Stepan Malkhasiants (about 130,000 entries). One of the definitive Armenian dictionaries. (Definitions are in Eastern Armenian, but include Western Armenian meanings of headwords.)
 ՀԱՅԵՐԷՆ ԱՐՄԱՏԱԿԱՆ ԲԱՌԱՐԱՆ by Hrachia Acharian (5,062 word roots). The definitive study of the history and origins of word roots in Armenian. Also includes explanations of each word root as it is used today. (Explanations are in Eastern Armenian, but root words span the entire Armenian language, including Western Armenian.)
 Armenian-English dictionary (about 70,000 entries).
 English-Armenian dictionary (about 96,000 entries).
 Armenian-French dictionary (about 18,000 entries).
 French-Armenian dictionary (about 20,000 entries).

Armenian languages
Endangered diaspora languages
Languages of France
Languages of Greece
Armenian, Western
Languages of Iraq
Languages of Lebanon
Languages of Syria
Languages of Turkey